Scott Mosher (born October 25, 1973 in Ottawa, Ontario) is a former field hockey forward from Canada.

International senior competitions
 1998 – World Cup, Utrecht (8th)
 1998 – Commonwealth Games, Kuala Lumpur (not ranked)
 1999 – Pan American Games, Winnipeg (1st)
 2000 – Americas Cup, Cuba (2nd)
 2000 – Olympic Games, Sydney (10th)

References
 Profile

External links

1973 births
Canadian male field hockey players
Field hockey people from Ontario
Field hockey players at the 2000 Summer Olympics
Living people
Male field hockey forwards
Olympic field hockey players of Canada
Sportspeople from Ottawa
Pan American Games gold medalists for Canada
Pan American Games medalists in field hockey
1998 Men's Hockey World Cup players
Field hockey players at the 1999 Pan American Games
Medalists at the 1999 Pan American Games
Field hockey players at the 1998 Commonwealth Games
Commonwealth Games competitors for Canada